WHAM (1180 kHz) is a commercial clear channel AM radio station in Rochester, New York, United States. It is owned by iHeartMedia and airs a news/talk radio format. The studios and offices are at Five Star Bank Plaza in downtown Rochester.

Its 50,000-watt non-directional transmitter, located in Chili, New York, operates the maximum power for commercial AM stations in the United States and Canada. During the day, it provides at least secondary coverage to all of Western New York, including Buffalo. It can also be heard in much of Southern Ontario, including Toronto, Peterborough, and Kingston. At night, WHAM can be received across much of the Eastern United States and Eastern Canada with a good radio. It is the Emergency Alert System's primary entry point station for Western New York.

Programming
WHAM carries two local newsblocks on weekdays: The WHAM Morning News and The WHAM 5 O'Clock Hour News. Local talk shows are Bob Lonsberry and Talking Back with Shannon Joy. The rest of the schedule is nationally syndicated talk shows, mostly from co-owned Premiere Networks: The Clay Travis and Buck Sexton Show, Sean Hannity and Coast to Coast AM with George Noory. In addition, WHAM carries Mark Levin from Westwood One and Joe Pags, who is based at co-owned WOAI in San Antonio.

Weekend programming includes shows on money, health, home repair, cars, technology and law. Weekend hosts include Bill Cunningham, computer expert Leo Laporte "The Tech Guy", and some brokered programming.

History

University of Rochester
While not the first station to be licensed to the Rochester market (that distinction belongs to the defunct WHQ), it is the oldest surviving station in the area.

The selection of the "WHAM" call letters came from a suggestion from industrialist George Eastman, the founder of the Eastman Kodak Company, based in Rochester. He helped the University of Rochester launch the station and thought the "WHAM" name would prove to be a clever marketing tool. Jim Barney helped the university get the station on the air.

Stromberg-Carlson
In 1927, WHAM was acquired by Stromberg-Carlson, a maker of radio and telecommunications equipment then based in Rochester. The company expanded the station's operations and boosted its signal to 5,000 watts shortly after the acquisition.

It was relocated from 1080 to 1150 kHz in the overall national reorganization of the AM radio band by the Federal Radio Commission in 1928. In 1933, WHAM was allowed to increase power to 25,000 watts. A ceremony marking the event included a three-hour broadcast from the Eastman Theatre with "a galaxy of stars" participating. It later got a boost to its current 50,000 watt level.

In the North American Regional Broadcasting Agreement (NARBA), the AM band was shuffled in March 1941. WHAM changed frequency once more to its current 1180 kHz.

Rochester Radio City
In February 1948, WHAM and its FM sister station, WHFM (now 98.9 WBZA), moved into a new facility, Rochester Radio City. The building included 24 offices and six studios, the largest of which could accommodate 400 people in the audience.

WHAM has ties to two of the city's television stations. It put the city's first station on the air, WHAM-TV, in 1949. That station is now WROC-TV, the area's CBS affiliate. In 2005, the area's ABC affiliate, WOKR, changed its call sign to WHAM-TV. Clear Channel Communications (now known as iHeartMedia) bought the station in 2002 and sold its entire television group to Newport Television (controlled by Providence Equity Partners) in 2007; the two stations still have a news partnership.

Controversy 
WHAM radio host Bob Lonsberry has often been the source of controversy, due to his on-air remarks. He was fired from his show in 2003, but was later brought back due to boycotts by aggrieved fans.

News articles were circulated about him comparing a derogatory racial reference to the term "Boomers" - a colloquial reference for people born during the Baby Boom. 

Lonsberry's show is also broadcast later in the day on co-owned WSYR 570 AM and 106.9 FM in Syracuse.

References

External links
WHAM 1180 home page

FCC History Cards for WHAM

HAM
Radio stations established in 1922
IHeartMedia radio stations
News and talk radio stations in the United States
1922 establishments in New York (state)
Clear-channel radio stations
Radio stations licensed before 1923 and still broadcasting